Radio Avenue is an American radio comedy broadcast on Denver's KGNU. It is presented by Dave Johnson and Bob Wells, joint owners of the Avenue Theater and Chicken Lips comedy company, with additional comments provided by Jared Ewy.

It is broadcast on the first Monday of each month at 8:00 pm (Mountain Time) and is recorded during a live performance at the Avenue Theater in Downtown Denver. Because of its improv comedy nature, Radio Avenue is recorded live to a free audience.

Featured artists include Dale Allen Robertson, Barbara J., and Paul Vens.

References

External links
 Official Website
 KGNU 88.5 FM in Boulder/1390 AM in Denver

American comedy radio programs
Culture of Denver